Bilal Elmi Njie (born 13 June 1998) is a Norwegian footballer who plays as a winger for Eliteserien club Haugesund. Bilal is the younger brother of Moussa Njie.

Career

Vålerenga 
Njie began his career at Vålerenga, and made his first team debut on 30 September 2017 in a 4-2 loss vs. Stabæk Fotball, coming on as a late substitute.  He also made 20 appearances for the reserve team in the 2017 season.

Odd 
Before the 2018 season, Njie signed a three-year contract with the Skien-based club Odd, instead of signing with his youth club Vålerenga. According to Njie, he chose to sign with Odd because of their well-known ability to develop young players.

KFUM 
Njie signed for KFUM-Kameratene Oslo on 5 October 2020.

On 5 December 2021, in the promotion playoffs for a spot in the Eliteserien, Njie scored two goals in their quarterfinal win over Fredrikstad, including a stoppage time equalizer to send the match to penalty kicks.

Career statistics

References

1998 births
Living people
Footballers from Oslo
Norwegian people of Gambian descent
Norwegian footballers
Eliteserien players
Norwegian First Division players
Norwegian Second Division players
Vålerenga Fotball players
Odds BK players
KFUM-Kameratene Oslo players
FK Haugesund players
Association football midfielders
Holmlia SK players